Visionary: The Video Singles is a series of 20 DualDisc singles in limited edition by American singer and recording artist Michael Jackson. It was released in Europe between February 20, 2006 and June 26, 2006, and then released in North America as a box set on November 14, 2006 by Epic Records and Legacy Recordings. 

When originally released, only the empty box and the "Thriller" single were released. Then a different single was released every week starting with "Don't Stop 'Til You Get Enough" and ending with "Blood On The Dance Floor". After 19 weeks, buyers would have the entire set. The limited edition cover artwork for the box set is a photomosaic using images from Jackson's career. Each single contains the title song, either a remix or b-side on the CD side, and its originally released music video on the DVD side. Audio for the video, and for the enhanced resolution music on the DVD side of the DualDisc, is PCM at 48 kHz. The Grammy and MTV Award-winning video for Scream was not part of the set.

Track listing (DVD side) 
 Details mentioned between parentheses for the n°2 tracks are from Wikipedia' sources. For the n°3 tracks they are mentioned on the majority of the singles.
 Tracks in n°2 and n°3 for the DVD side are respectively in n°1 and n°2 for the CD side.

Release history

Charts (single details)
Note: original chart positions are in brackets

Others

Remix EP
Released on February 21, 2006, Visionary Remixes – EP is only available from the iTunes Store.

CD Promo
 "Thriller" (Remixed Short Version) – 4:09
 "Don't Stop 'til You Get Enough" (7' Edit) – 3:59
 "Rock with You" (7' Edit) – 3:23
 "Billie Jean" – 4:54
 "Beat It" – 4:18

References

External links
 Michael Jackson News International

2006 compilation albums
Michael Jackson compilation albums
Michael Jackson video albums
Albums produced by Michael Jackson
Albums produced by Quincy Jones
Epic Records compilation albums
Legacy Recordings compilation albums